The Real Thing or Real Thing may refer to:

Film and television
 The Real Thing (film) or Livers Ain't Cheap, a 1996 American film
 The Real Thing, a 1980 television documentary by James Burke
 "The Real Thing" (All Saints), a television episode
 "The Real Thing" (Lovejoy), a television episode

Literature
 The Real Thing (play), a 1982 play by Tom Stoppard
 "The Real Thing" (story), an 1892 short story by Henry James
 The Real Thing, a 1980 collection of humorous essays by Kurt Andersen
 "The Real Thing", a 2006 short story by Alison Goodman

Music

Performers
 The Real Thing (British band), a pop group
 The Real Thing (Norwegian band), a jazz quartet
 The Real Thing, an American jazz group fronted by Ray Santisi

Albums
 The Real Thing (Angela Winbush album), 1989
 The Real Thing (Bo Bice album) or the title song, 2005
 The Real Thing (Dizzy Gillespie album), 1970
 The Real Thing (Eric Alexander album) or the title song, 2015
 The Real Thing (Faith No More album) or the title song, 1989
 The Real Thing (Houston Person album), 1973
 The Real Thing (Louis Hayes album), 1978
 The Real Thing (Midnight Oil album) or the title cover of the Russell Morris song (see below), 2000
 The Real Thing (PureNRG album) or the title song, 2009
 The Real Thing (Russell Morris album), 2002
 The Real Thing (Taj Mahal album), 1971
 The Real Thing (Vanessa Williams album) or the title song (see below), 2009
 The Real Thing: In Performance (1964–1981), a video album by Marvin Gaye, 2006
 The Real Thing: Words and Sounds Vol. 3, an album by Jill Scott, or the title song, 2007
 Real Thing (The Higgins album) or the title song, 2008

Songs
 "The Real Thing" (2 Unlimited song), 1994
 "The Real Thing" (ABC song), 1989
 "The Real Thing" (Gwen Stefani song), 2005
 "The Real Thing" (Highway song), 2016
 "The Real Thing" (Jellybean song), 1987
 "The Real Thing" (Lisa Stansfield song), 1997
 "The Real Thing" (Russell Morris song), 1969
 "The Real Thing" (Tony Di Bart song), 1993
 "The Real Thing" (Vanessa Williams song), 2009
 "Real Thing" (Ruel song), 2019
 "The Real Thing", written by Ashford & Simpson with Jo Armstead; recorded by Betty Everett (1965) and Tina Britt (1965) 
 "The Real Thing", by the Brothers Johnson from Winners, 1981
 "The Real Thing", by Christina Aguilera (as Jade St. John) from the TV series Nashville, 2015
 "The Real Thing", by Client Liaison, 2019
 "The Real Thing", by FEMM from Femm-Isation, 2014
 "The Real Thing", by Kenny Loggins from Leap of Faith, 1991
 "The Real Thing", by Kingston Wall from III – Tri-Logy, 1994
 "The Real Thing", by Lords of Acid from Strange Days (Music from the Motion Picture), 1995
 "The Real Thing", by Phoenix from Bankrupt!, 2013
 "The Real Thing", by Warren Haynes from Live at Bonnaroo, 2004
 "Real Thing", by Alice in Chains from Facelift, 1990
 "Real Thing", by Boys Like Girls from Love Drunk, 2009
 "Real Thing", by KMFDM from Hau Ruck, 2005
 "Real Thing", by Pearl Jam and Cypress Hill from the Judgement Night film soundtrack, 1993
 "Real Thing", by Stars from There Is No Love in Fluorescent Light, 2017
 "Real Thing", by Sugababes from One Touch, 2000
 "Real Thing", by Tory Lanez from Memories Don't Die, 2018
 "Real Thing", by Zac Brown Band from Welcome Home, 2017

See also
 "Ain't Nothing Like the Real Thing", a song by Marvin Gaye and Tammi Terrell
 "Even Better Than the Real Thing", a song by U2
 "It's the Real Thing", a song by Angela Winbush
 "It's the Real Thing", a Coca-Cola slogan
 Real Things (disambiguation)